The women's 10,000 metres event featured at the 1999 World Championships in Seville, Spain. The final was held on 26 August 1999.

Final ranking

References
 Official results from IAAF

Events at the 1999 World Championships in Athletics
10,000 metres at the World Athletics Championships
1999 in women's athletics